Iván Marcelo Cisternas Tapia (born 1 August 1967) is a Chilean civil engineer and politician who served as provincial governor during the two governments of Sebastián Piñera.

In 2016, he unsuccessfully run to be mayor of Quillota.

On 22 March 2012, he assumed as president of the football club San Luis Quillota.

Political career
Born in Quillota, his whole education was carried out at the Instituo Rafael Ariztía (IRA) of his hometown.

He graduated as a Mechanical Engineer at the Pontificia Universidad Católica de Valparaíso. By the other hand, he graduated as a Civil Industrial Engineer from the Universidad del Mar and also obtained an MBA in Marketing and Sales at the same university.

From 1998 to 2003, he worked at the Compañía Sudamericana de Vapores.

In 2017, he was director of the Planning Secretariat of the Municipality of La Cruz.

Electoral record

2013 Parliamentary elections
For the 9th District of Combarbalá, Canela, Illapel, Los Vilos, Punitaqui, Salamanca and Monte Patria.

References

External Links
 Profile at Gobernación Choapa 

1967 births
Living people 
21st-century Chilean politicians
Instituto Rafael Ariztía alumni
Pontifical Catholic University of Valparaíso alumni
National Renewal (Chile) politicians